The 2018 4 Hours of Le Castellet was  an endurance motor race that took place at the Circuit Paul Ricard near Le Castellet, France between 13 and 15 April 2018, and served as the opening round of the 2018 European Le Mans Series.

The overall race victory was taken by the LMP2-class Oreca 07 of Racing Engineering, with Norman Nato, Paul Petit and Olivier Pla winning on the teams' debut in the series.

Qualifying

Qualifying result
Pole position in class is denoted with a yellow background.

Notes
  – The No° 86 Gulf Racing Porsche 911 RSR originally qualified second in class but had all lap times deleted due to a stewards' decision.

Race

Race result
Class winners are denoted with a yellow background.

Notes
  – The No° 11 Eurointernational Ligier JS P3 was issued with a 30-second time penalty due to a stewards' decision.

References

External links
 

4 Hours
4 Hours
6 Hours of Castellet